Muhammad Yunus (born 7 July 1988) is Indonesian footballer who currently plays as a midfielder for PSIS Semarang in the Liga 1.

Career

Persitema Temanggung 
M. Yunus started his professional career with the Persitema Temanggung since competing the Divisi II Liga Indonesia to promotion to Divisi I Liga Indonesia. In the 2012/2013 Liga Indonesia Premier Division, M. Yunus led Persitema Temanggung in the 5th of Fist Stage Liga Indonesia Premier Division which is the club's best achievement to date.

PSIS Semarang 
In 2014 he signed a contract with PSIS Semarang. In the first season, M. Yunus became the 3rd club's top goal scorer with Ronald Fagundez for PSIS Semarang with 6 goals from 24 appearances while helping PSIS Semarang to qualify for the quarter-finals Liga Indonesia Premier Division. In the 2017, Yunus success led PSIS Semarang to promote to Liga 1.

Honours

Klub 
PSIS Semarang
 Polda jateng Intidana Cup
 Winners: 2015
 Liga 2 (Indonesia)
 3rd: 2017

Personal life
Yunus married to Ayu Kusuma Wijaya on Saturday January 24, 2014 and has a son.

References

External links

Muhamad Yunus

1988 births
Living people
Javanese people
Indonesian Muslims
Indonesian footballers
PSIS Semarang players
Liga 1 (Indonesia) players
Association football wingers
People from Temanggung Regency
Sportspeople from Central Java